Italy '90 Soccer is a football video game developed by Dardari Bros and distributed by Simulmondo in 1988

It was the first of many unofficial games that would be released for the 1990 World Cup.

Versions 

The game was released for Amiga and Commodore 64 in Italy.

See also 
 World Cup Soccer: Italia '90 - the official game
 World Cup Italia '90 (Tiertex)
 Italia 1990 Codemasters

References

External links 
 Game at HOL

1990 video games
Association football video games
Amiga games
Commodore 64 games
FIFA World Cup video games
1990 FIFA World Cup
Video games developed in Italy